The Clay Street Hill Railroad was the first successful cable hauled street railway. It was located on Clay Street, a notably steep street in San Francisco in California, United States, and first operated in August 1873.

History
The promoter of the line was Andrew Smith Hallidie, and the engineer was William Eppelsheimer. Accounts differ as to exactly how involved Hallidie was in the inception of the Clay Street Hill Railway. One version has him taking over the promotion of the line when the original promoter, Benjamin Brooks, failed to raise the necessary capital. In another version, Hallidie was the instigator, inspired by a desire to reduce the suffering incurred by the horses that hauled streetcars up Jackson Street, from Kearny to Stockton Street.

There is also doubt as to when exactly the first run of the cable car occurred. The franchise required a first run no later than August 1, 1873. However, at least one source reports that the run took place a day late, on August 2, but the city chose not to void the franchise. Some accounts say that the first gripman hired by Hallidie looked down the steep hill from Jones and refused to operate the car, so Hallidie took the grip himself and ran the car down the hill and up again without any problems.

The Clay Street line started regular service on September 1, 1873 and was a financial success. In 1888, it was absorbed into the Sacramento-Clay line of the Ferries and Cliff House Railway, and it subsequently became a small part of the San Francisco cable car system. Today none of the original line survives. However grip car 8 from the line has been preserved, and is now displayed in the San Francisco Cable Car Museum.

Design
The line involved the use of grip cars, which carried the grip that engaged with the cable, towing trailer cars. The design was the first to use such grips.

Legacy

The railroad was designated as California Historical Landmark #500, with the landmark marker being placed in Portsmouth Square at the site of its eastern terminus near the corner of Clay Street and Kearny.

In fiction
In the film Herbie Rides Again, Mrs. Steimetz owns a cable car from the Clay Street Hill Railroad, which she calls "Old 22".

References
Specific:

General:

Streetcars in California
Cable car railways in the United States
Public transportation in San Francisco
History of San Francisco
Defunct California railroads
Defunct public transport operators in the United States
Landmarks in California
Landmarks in San Francisco
1873 establishments in California
1942 disestablishments in California